Priboj is a village in the municipalities of Lopare (Republika Srpska) and Teočak, Tuzla Canton, Bosnia and Herzegovina.

Demographics 
According to the 2013 census, its population was 1,358, all of them living in the Lopare part, thus none in Teočak.

References

Populated places in Teočak
Populated places in Lopare